Y16 may refer to:

Y-16 Salon or Salon-de-Provence Air Base, a base of the French Air Force located in southern France
Youth Bandy World Championship World Championship Y16